Asphondylia prosopidis, the mesquite gall midge, is a species of gall midges in the family Cecidomyiidae.

References

Further reading

 
 

Cecidomyiinae
Articles created by Qbugbot
Insects described in 1898

Diptera of North America
Taxa named by Theodore Dru Alison Cockerell
Gall-inducing insects